Steven Irwin (born 29 September 1990) is an English footballer who plays as a midfielder for Widnes.

Career
Irwin played youth football in his native England with Liverpool. He trialled with Scottish club Aberdeen in January 2011, with a view to a loan deal. He was released by Liverpool in June 2011.

Later that summer he signed for Dutch club Telstar, making his senior professional debut for them during the 2011–12 season.

On 17 November 2011, Telstar coach Jan Poortvliet confirmed Irwin had left the club, citing homesickness as a factor in his departure.

In September 2012 he signed for Finnish Premier League club FF Jaro.

After playing in Denmark in 2015 for AaB, in February 2017 he signed for English non-league side Skelmersdale United.

In August 2017 he signed for FC United of Manchester. During his time at FC United, he made 28 league appearances scoring four goals.

After a spell at Stalybridge Celtic, Irwin joined Northern Premier League side Marine in September 2018.

He retired at the end of the 2019–20 season, but returned to playing in January 2022 after re-signing with Marine. He left Marine for Warrington Rylands in March 2022.

Irwin played as a goalkeeper for Warrington Rylands against their rivals Warrington Town on 4 October 2022 due to the club not having a recognised keeper.

On October 28 2022, Irwin signed for Widnes.

References

1990 births
Living people
English footballers
Liverpool F.C. players
SC Telstar players
FF Jaro players
AaB Fodbold players
Skelmersdale United F.C. players
Eerste Divisie players
Veikkausliiga players
Association football midfielders
English expatriate footballers
English expatriate sportspeople in the Netherlands
Expatriate footballers in the Netherlands
English expatriate sportspeople in Finland
Expatriate footballers in Finland
English expatriate sportspeople in Denmark
Expatriate men's footballers in Denmark
F.C. United of Manchester players
Stalybridge Celtic F.C. players
Marine F.C. players
Warrington Rylands 1906 F.C. players
Widnes F.C. players